The 2003 MAAC Men's Ice Hockey Tournament was the 5th and final championship in the history of the conference. It was played between March 15 and March 23, 2003. Quarterfinal games were played at home team campus sites, while the final four games were played at the Hart Center in Worcester, Massachusetts, the home venue of the Army Black Knights. By winning the tournament Mercyhurst received MAAC's automatic bid to the 2003 NCAA Men's Division I Ice Hockey Tournament.

After the 2003 season, both the Fairfield Stags and Iona Gaels discontinued their hockey programs. The remaining 9 teams in the conference then formed Atlantic Hockey which began play in 2003-04.

Format
The tournament featured three rounds of play with each round being single-elimination. The teams that finish below eighth in the standings are ineligible for tournament play. In the first round, the first and eighth seeds, the second and seventh seeds, the third seed and sixth seeds, and the fourth seed and fifth seeds played with the winner advancing to the semifinals. In the semifinals, the highest and lowest seeds and second highest and second lowest seeds play with the winner advancing to the championship game.  The tournament champion receives an automatic bid to the 2003 NCAA Men's Division I Ice Hockey Tournament.

Conference standings
Note: GP = Games played; W = Wins; L = Losses; T = Ties; PTS = Points; GF = Goals For; GA = Goals Against

Bracket

Teams are reseeded after the quarterfinals

Note: * denotes overtime period(s)

Quarterfinals

(1) Mercyhurst vs. (8) Iona

(2) Quinnipiac vs. (7) Canisius

(3) Holy Cross vs. (6) Army

(4) Sacred Heart vs. (5) Bentley

Semifinals

(1) Mercyhurst vs. (5) Bentley

(2) Quinnipiac vs. (3) Holy Cross

Championship

(1) Mercyhurst vs. (2) Quinnipiac

Tournament awards

All-Tournament Team
F Matt Craig (Quinnipiac)
F David Wrigley* (Mercyhurst)
F Dave Borrelli (Mercyhurst)
D Mike Muldoon (Mercyhurst)
D T. J. Kemp (Mercyhurst)
G Andy Franck (Mercyhurst)
* Most Valuable Player(s)

References

MAAC Men's Ice Hockey Tournament
MAAC Men's Ice Hockey Tournament